Alfond is a surname. Notable people with the surname include:

Bill Alfond (born 1949), American investor, philanthropist, and billionaire
Harold Alfond (1914–2007), American businessman
Justin Alfond (born 1975), American politician
Peter Alfond (1952–2017), American investor, philanthropist, and billionaire
Susan Alfond (born 1946), American investor, philanthropist, and billionaire
Ted Alfond (born 1945), American investor, philanthropist, and billionaire

See also
Alfond Stadium (disambiguation)